The 2020 Japan Premier League was the 'x'th season of the Japan Premier League, the highest level of domestic cricket in Japan. It was won by South Kanto, Super Kings, who won their 4th title.

Teams

References

Japan Football League
J.League